Kakata (pronounced Kak-ah-tah), is the capital city of Liberia's Margibi County and is located in Kakata District just over the Du River bridge which is its border with Todee District. It is a transit town at the heart of the historical natural rubber cultivation belt in Liberia. The city is colloquially known as "Kak City". The City host the Office of the National Civil Society Council of Liberia (NCSCL), Margibi Chapter. The Council which is headed by Mr. Friday Edwin CRUSOR, is known for its diligent role in Advocacy, Dialogue, Peacebuilding among others.

It is estimated that the city is surrounded by more than one hundred thousand acres of rubber plantations, most of which are now past latex production. Though the Salala Rubber Company and Firestone Liberia are not far from Kakata, the nearby rubber plantations are mostly privately owned. Morris American Rubber Company (MARCO) and Bright Farm are the two largest, and Liberian-owned plantations, by area around Kakata. Small and medium-holder rubber plantations also dot most of the landscape.

Kakata has many primary and secondary schools. One of the most notable is Booker Washington Institute (BWI), Liberia's premiere vocational high school and technical institution.  It also hosts KRTTI, [Kakata Rural Teacher Training Institute], which trains Liberian elementary, lower-grade and secondary teachers.  It has Ten Senior High Schools: St. Christopher Catholic High School, St. Augustine, Methodist, Pentecostal Conquerors Academy, Kakata Community College, Francis Michell, Lango Lippaye, St. Paul Lutheran, Kakata YMCA  and BWI.  Lango Lippaye and Harbel Multilateral are the two Government Senior High Schools in Margibi county.  There are five government junior high schools: the KRTTI Demonstration school, E. J. Yancy, Special Project, E. J. Yancy Annex and Lango Lippaye. Students from all over Liberia come to Kakata for studies at these institutions.

C. H. Rennie Hospital in Kakata is the only government referral hospital in the County and it is the headquarters for the Margibi County health team. The Firestone Duside Hospital in Harbel is the nearest referral health care facility.

Kakata has a large daily market in the center of town.  Kakata is a meeting point between urban and rural Liberia: Many of Kakata’s inhabitants either travel to Monrovia to bring goods to Kakata to sell or travel to the rural areas, to bring production back to Kakata to sell. The primary groups are Kpelle and Bassa, but all the different groups from across Liberia are represented in Kakata.

As of the 2008 census, Kakata has a population of 33,945. Of this, 16,501 were male and 17,444 female; it is the fifth most populous urban area in Liberia.

Radio coverage
Radio is one of the main source of news and community engagement.  The prominent stations broadcasting in Kakata are:
 Radio Kakata FM 101.7 MHz
 Atlantic Radio FM 92.7 MHz
 Radio Margibi FM 103.9 MHz
 The BBC World Service IS FM 103.0 MHz
 ELBC FM 99.9 MHz
 Radio Joy Africa FM 97.5 MHz
 Hope Communication Inc. FM 94.9 MHz
 Classic FM 93.5 MHz

Geography
The city is connected by the paved highway from Monrovia, Liberia via Paynesville, Liberia, and to Firestone Natural Rubber Company's Harbel, Liberia in the south by a dirt dusty road 26th Gate road, and by the paved 15th Gate plantation road in Careysburg, Liberia.  It is also connected to Bong Town, Liberia to the north by a partially paved road, by the dusty Borlala road, to Gibi mountain and Gibi District in the east. Finally the paved Monrovia highway continues northeast to Salala, Liberia and Gbarnga.

See also
 List of schools in Liberia

References

Margibi County
County capitals in Liberia